Stara Dąbia  is a village in the administrative district of Gmina Ryki, within Ryki County, Lublin Voivodeship, in eastern Poland.

References

Villages in Ryki County